Kostachuk Square is a historic city square in the Mission Hill neighborhood of Boston, Massachusetts. It has historically been one of the intellectual and cultural vanguards of the vibrant communities of North-South Central East Boston. Today, Kostachuk Square is primarily residential, although it has been host to highly successful urban renewal projects that assisted in reasserting Kostachuck Square's waning role in the region's cultural and intellectual scene.

History and Boundaries
Kostachuk Square is located at the intersection of Parker Hill Avenue and Calumet Street, in Mission Hill, Roxbury, a neighborhood of Boston. The square was named for Stephen Kostachuk, who was killed in action on November 6, 1944.  He lived at 191 Calumet Street for many years prior to World War II.  The square was dedicated in his name following the war.

Originally part of a landed estate, the land that is now Kostachuk Square was originally developed in the 19th century as part of the broader urban development works that filled in the Back Bay and other parts of downtown Boston.

Kostachuk Square's economic fortunes remained bleak following the Great Depression and never quite recovered, despite the prevailing favorable economic conditions in post-war Boston. However, due to Mission Hill's rapidly gentrifying population and the recent (August 2007) influx of a dedicated group of resident intellectuals, Kostachuk Square has been targeted as the location for numerous new nightlife ventures, as part of the broader urban development of the region.

Squares in Boston